Jakubčovice Fotbal is a Czech football club. In 2006–2007, it played in the Czech 2. Liga. After finishing 11th in the table, it was swapped by FK Dukla Prague, and Jakubčovice Fotbal began the next season in a lower division.

After the 2009–10 season, when the team finished second in Czech Fourth Division's Divize E and was due for promotion to the MSFL, the club was relegated to the 7th tier (1.B třída sk. D – Moravskoslezský kraj).

Honours
Moravian–Silesian Football League (third tier)
 Champions 2005–06

References

External links
 Official website 

Football clubs in the Czech Republic
Association football clubs established in 1952
Nový Jičín District